The Central District of Darreh Shahr County is a district (bakhsh) in Darreh Shahr County, Ilam Province, Iran. At the 2006 census, its population was 34,983, in 7,176 families.  The District has one city: Darreh Shahr.  The District has two rural districts (dehestan): Aramu Rural District and Zarrin Dasht Rural District.

References 

Districts of Ilam Province
Darreh Shahr County